Robert Anthony Argus (January 21, 1894 – December 8, 1945) was an American football player for the Rochester Jeffersons from 1920 to 1925.

References

External links
 NFL.com profile

1894 births
1945 deaths
American football fullbacks
American football halfbacks
American football quarterbacks
Rochester Jeffersons players
Players of American football from New York (state)
People from Hammondsport, New York